Repeater Glacier is a steep glacier,  long, flowing east from Ponder Peak in the Asgard Range of Victoria Land, Antarctica. This glacier and the Commanda Glacier, close southward, drain the eastern slopes of the Mount Newall massif before entering lower Newall Glacier. Named by the New Zealand Geographic Board in 1998 in recognition of the radio repeater installed by New Zealand on Mount Newall.

References

Glaciers of the Asgard Range
Glaciers of Scott Coast